The "U.S. Field Artillery March" is a patriotic military march of the United States Army written in 1917 by John Philip Sousa after an earlier work by Edmund L. Gruber.  The refrain is the "Caissons Go Rolling Along".  This song inspired the official song of the U.S. Army, "The Army Goes Rolling Along".

Background
Sousa served in the United States Marine Corps, and was a member of the U.S. Navy during World War I.  He was asked by Army Lieutenant George Friedlander, of the 306th Field Artillery, to compose a march for his regiment.  Friedlander suggested it be built around a song already known as The Caisson Song (alternatively The Field Artillery Song or The Caissons Go Rolling Along).  The song was thought to perhaps be of Civil War origin, and was unpublished, and its composer believed to be dead. Sousa agreed, changed the harmonic structure, set it in a different key, refined the melody, made the rhythm more snappy, and added further new material.

Sousa and Lieutenant Friedlander were surprised to later learn that the composer of The Caisson Song was still living and that the song had been written in 1908 by artillery First Lieutenant (later Brigadier General) Edmund L. Gruber, with some help on the lyrics from Lieutenant William Bryden, and Lieutenant (later Major General) Robert M. Danford, while stationed at Fort Stotsenburg in the Philippines.  Reportedly, Gruber may have been influenced by music composed by Alfred C. Montin at Fort Sheridan in Illinois, shortly before his unit was transferred to Fort Sill in Oklahoma.

It appears that Gruber did not object to Sousa's use of the song, at least not initially, and that Sousa passed on his royalties to Gruber. However, other sources state that Gruber became involved in a prolonged legal battle to recover the rights to the music he had written and that had been lifted (unknowingly or not) by Sousa and widely sold by sheet music publishers who reaped profits while Gruber received nothing. The music became so popular that it was also used in radio ads by firms such as the Hoover Vacuum Company.  Gruber's position was rejected by the courts, which ruled that he had waited too long to complain and that his music was by that time in the public domain.

Lyrics

The lyrics as of 1918 are as follows:

Alternatively:

The phrase in the first line is Shakespearean, from A Midsummer Night's Dream, Act II, Scene 1: "Over hill, over dale / Thorough bush, thorough briar / Over park, over pale / Thorough flood, thorough fire".

See also 
 List of marches by John Philip Sousa

References

External links

Sousa marches
1917 compositions
American military marches
Concert band pieces